Ugransky District is an administrative and municipal district (raion), one of the twenty-five in Smolensk Oblast, Russia. It is located in the east of the oblast. Its administrative center is the rural locality (a selo) of Ugra. Population: 8,916 (2010 Census);  The population of Ugra accounts for 48.0% of the district's total population.

People
 Mikhail Isakovsky (1900–1973)

References

Notes

Sources

Districts of Smolensk Oblast